Where the Lark Sings (German: Wo die Lerche singt) is a 1936 musical comedy film directed by Carl Lamac and starring Mártha Eggerth, Alfred Neugebauer and Hans Söhnker. It is an Operetta film, based on the 1918 work Where the Lark Sings by Franz Lehár. The film was a German language co-production between Hungary, Germany and Switzerland.

Cast
 Mártha Eggerth as Baronesse Margit von Bardy 
 Alfred Neugebauer as Baron von Bardy - ihr Vater 
 Hans Söhnker as Hans Berend 
 Lucie Englisch as Anna - Margrits Zofe 
 Fritz Imhoff as Török - Faktotum bei Bardy 
 Rudolf Carl as Pista - Knecht bei Bardy 
 Oskar Pouché as Zakos, Mühlenbesitzer 
 Robert Valberg as Lawyer Dr. Kolbe 
 Gisa Wurm as Emma Kolbe - seine Frau 
 Tibor Halmay as Willi Kolbe - deren Sohn 
 Maria Matzner as Piri, Magd 
 Rita Tanagra as Else - Margits Freundin 
 Leo Resnicek as Autobus-Chauffeur 
 Karl Hauser as Gyuri - Kellner 
 Joe Furtner as Dr. Dudas 
 Anna Kallina as Mutter von Hans Berend

Bibliography
 Bergfelder, Tim & Bock, Hans-Michael. ''The Concise Cinegraph: Encyclopedia of German. Berghahn Books, 2009.

External links

1936 films
1936 musical comedy films
German musical comedy films
Hungarian musical comedy films
Swiss musical comedy films
1930s German-language films
Films of Nazi Germany
Films directed by Karel Lamač
Operetta films
Films based on operettas
Films set in Hungary
German black-and-white films
1930s German films